The 2022–2023 mpox outbreak in the Philippines is a part of the larger global outbreak of human mpox caused by the West African clade of the monkeypox virus.  The outbreak was first reported in the Philippines when a suspected case was confirmed on July 28, 2022 according to the Department of Health.

Background

History

Arrival
The first case of human mpox in the Philippines was confirmed on July 28, 2022. The case involved a 31-year-old Filipino national who arrived from abroad to the Philippines on July 19, 2022. He also had prior travel to countries with documented mpox cases. The individual's mpox infection was confirmed through a reverse transcription–polymerase chain reaction (RT-PCR) test at the Research Institute for Tropical Medicine in Muntinlupa which yielded a positive result on July 28, 2022. The patient had already recovered at the time of the health department's announcement but is undergoing isolation at home. Ten other people, including three people from the individual's household were identified as close contacts.

On August 6, 2022, the patient was discharged after undergoing the 21-day quarantine isolation to which no other person was infected according to the Department of Health (DOH). Other close contacts tested negative too though they are still required to complete their 21 days of quarantine.

Further cases
On August 19, 2022, the DOH announced the detection of two more cases; those of a 34-year-old and a 29-year-old both of which has a history of travel abroad. The 34-year-old patient is undergoing home isolation and the 29-year-old patient is in isolation at a health facility. Contract tracing was conducted for both with the latter having 17 identified contacts. The PCR test conducted for both individuals returned positive results on August 18 and 19 respectively.

All three cases at that time are unrelated to each other as they entered the Philippines from different countries and the DOH considered these cases as "imported" cases. They have exhibited typical symptoms associated with mpox like lesions on their faces and other parts of their bodies.

DOH Technical Advisory Group (TAG) member Dr. Edsel Salvana says he expects more cases to be detected but allayed concerns of a local transmission or the disease becoming endemic in the country. He points out that mpox is less contagious than COVID-19 and that protocols in place for the COVID-19 pandemic is also mitigating the spread of mpox.

On August 22, the DOH announced that the country has detected its fourth case that of a 25-year-old Filipino who have no travel history outside the country. The individual's PCR Test returned a positive result on August 19. The health department also stated that the fourth case is not related to the previous three. The following day the health department's Western Visayas regional office, released further details regarding the patient confined in a hospital; a male who works in Iloilo City and resides in Iloilo province. Iloilo City mayor Jerry Treñas in an interview with local radio stations said that the indicidual worked in a fast food chain in the city and added that he had a relative who recently came in from abroad.

The DOH also asked the Western Visayas regional office to investigate the photos of the patient shared on social media as early as August 22 deeming such act as an unauthorized disclosure of private and confidential information.

The second case was deemed recovered on August 31 while the third case was considered the same on September 8. The fourth case was discharged from the hospital on September 15 and is deemed to have recovered.

Related cases abroad
On September 5, 2022, the first ever case of mpox in Hong Kong was detected from a passenger who arrived from a flight from Manila. The individual concerned is a 30-year old Hong Konger.

Response
On May 24, 2022, the DOH expressed readiness to detect and contain mpox if it reaches the Philippines. It has classified mpox as a notifiable disease requiring health facilities in the country to report all patients under investigation and cases to its Epidemiology Bureau (EB) and Regional Epidemiology Surveillance Unit. It also announced that all suspected cases are to undergo reverse transcription–polymerase chain reaction (RT-PCR) tests for mpox.

By June 20, 2022, the Research Institute for Tropical Medicine in Muntinlupa announced that it has optimized its real-time polymerase chain reaction (PCR) assay for the detection of monkeypox virus.

As of July 2022, the RITM and the Philippine Genome Center in Quezon City are the only institutions in the Philippines capable of detecting mpox through RT-PCR tests. The DOH has aimed to expand capacity and capability to other institutional hospitals as well. Ninoy Aquino International Airport and several national airports ramped up their surveillance to detect the virus. In an explicit statement on August 2, 2022, DOH Officer in Charge Maria Rosario Vergeire said that borders and foreign entry are not to be shut down whilst not yet receiving recommendations from the World Health Organization (WHO). Furthermore, it was affirmed that the opening of classes and universities will still resume on August 22 accordingly along with the cooperation of DepEd and local LGUs.

The DOH has also entered negotiations with the United States government in a bid to secure mpox vaccines for a limited demographic. Along with the WHO, the DOH has been proactively monitoring cases and revamping medical facilities in the country.

Upon the detection of the first case, the Private Hospitals Association of the Philippines Inc. released a statement advising against home isolation for further suspected mpox cases.

Notes

See also 

 COVID-19 pandemic in the Philippines

References

External links 

 Department of Health official public health advisory

Philippines
Mpox
Mpox